The Military ranks of South Yemen were the military insignia used by the People's Democratic Republic of Yemen Armed Forces until its dissolution during the 1990 Yemeni unification.

Military ranks (1970–1980)

Commissioned officer ranks
The rank insignia of commissioned officers.

Other ranks
The rank insignia of non-commissioned officers and enlisted personnel.

Military ranks (1980–1990)

Commissioned officer ranks
The rank insignia of commissioned officers.

Other ranks
The rank insignia of non-commissioned officers and enlisted personnel.

References

External links
 

Oman
Military of Yemen
South Yemen